Mahmudabad-e Olya (also Romanized as Maḩmūdābād-e ‘Olyā) is a village in Jangal Rural District, in the Central District of Fasa County, Fars Province, Iran. At the 2006 census, its population was 340, in 74 families.

References 

Populated places in Fasa County